Tony Johnson (born March 12, 1982) is a former American football wide receiver. He played collegiately at Penn State from 2000 to 2003. Entering the 2008 season, he was ranked 10th all time in receptions for the Nittany Lions with 107, and 9th in receiving yards with 1,702. Johnson was listed at 5'11, 209 lbs. and wore number 11. His older brother is former NFL running back Larry Johnson. Tony was also Larry's manager.

Tony is the second of three children, born to Christine and Larry Johnson Sr. His father, Larry Johnson, Sr., is a former high school coach, and the current defensive line coach at The Ohio State University. Johnson attended State College Area High School in State College, Pennsylvania, and was recruited by several college teams. Originally a quarterback and running back in high school, he converted to wide receiver upon committing to the Nittany Lions.

From 2001 to 2002, Johnson served as the Nittany Lions' second-choice receiver, playing alongside Bryant Johnson. In 2002, he had three receiving touchdowns, caught 34 passes, and gained 549 receiving yards. In 2003, when he was a senior at Penn State, Johnson was charged with DUI. He was suspended for two games by the team after this incident. Following his return, Johnson had three touchdowns in a game against Indiana.

Tony married his wife, Karin Grapp-Johnson, in the summer of 2009. They have three children, two boys and a girl. He now resides in Ohio, where he remotely is able to fulfill his managing duties for older brother Larry Johnson. Tony travels often to attend and accompany Larry to Bengals home and away games.

References

1982 births
Living people
People from Charles County, Maryland
African-American players of American football
American football wide receivers
Penn State Nittany Lions football players
21st-century African-American sportspeople
20th-century African-American people